The former US Post Office, also known as the US Post Office/Federal Building, is an historic red brick post office building located at 430 South Spring Street in downtown Burlington, North Carolina. Built in 1936, it was designed in a mixture of the Classical Revival and Moderne or Art Deco styles by architect R. Stanley Brown who worked under Louis A. Simon, head of the Office of the Supervising Architect.

In the building's lobby are two wall murals by WPA artist Arthur L. Bairnsfather, which commemorate Burlington's history as a textile manufacturing center.

Since November 3, 1987, the building has been owned by Roche Biomedical Laboratories, Inc., a subsidiary of Hoffmann-La Roche, Inc.

On September 23, 1988, it was added to the National Register of Historic Places. It is located in the Downtown Burlington Historic District.

References

External links
 Vintage Postcard – United States Post Office, Burlington, N.C.

Burlington
Neoclassical architecture in North Carolina
Art Deco architecture in North Carolina
Government buildings completed in 1936
Buildings and structures in Burlington, North Carolina
National Register of Historic Places in Alamance County, North Carolina
Individually listed contributing properties to historic districts on the National Register in North Carolina